Foreign relations exist between Azerbaijan and Malaysia. Azerbaijan has an embassy in Kuala Lumpur, while Malaysia has an embassy in Baku. Both countries are members of the Group of 77.

History 

Malaysia recognised the independence of the Republic of Azerbaijan on 31 December 1991 and on 5 April 1993 full diplomatic relations were established.

Economic relations 
In 2012, the total export from Malaysia to Azerbaijan stood at US$14.15 million, with fuel and chemical components being the largest contributors at US$4.1 million and palm oil at US$3.3 million. In the same year, around 290 Malaysians travelled to Azerbaijan for business and work, especially in the petrochemical sector, while there were some 50 Azerbaijani citizens in Malaysia who were mostly students and also in the business sector. The Malaysian cargo airlines also has chosen Azerbaijan as its main transit hub.

Diplomacy

Republic of Azerbaijan
Kuala Lumpur (Embassy) 

Republic of Malaysia
Baku (Embassy)

See also  
 Foreign relations of Azerbaijan
 Foreign relations of Malaysia

References

External links 
 Kuala Lumpur Regional Centre For Arbitration (KLRCA) Azerbaijan Arbitration and Mediation Center
 Azerbaijan-Malaysia Relations  Azerbaijan Arbitration and Mediation Center

 
Malaysia
Bilateral relations of Malaysia